Swaralaya Kairali Yesudas Award (or usually referred to as  Yesudas Award) is an award for music artists in recognition to their outstanding performance. The award is instituted jointly by Swaralaya, an organization that promotes music and Kairali Channel, based at Trivandrum, India. Awards have been given annually since 2000. K. J. Yesudas presents the awards at a Gandharva Sandhya on every January.

Swaralaya-Kairali-Yesudas awardees

Special Jury awardees

Swaralaya-Kairali-Yesudas Legendary awardees
Swaralaya-Kairali-Yesudas Legendary award was introduced in 2010 in order to honour the legends in music.

See also
 Yesudas

External links
Swaralaya Kairali Yesudas Award list
Award 2008
Award 2008
Award 2007
Award 2006
Award 2005

K. J. Yesudas
Indian music awards
2000 establishments in Kerala
Awards established in 2000
Kerala awards